is a series of role-playing video games developed by HummingBirdSoft. The first two installments were released on the Family Computer Disk System by Square's label DOG; the third one was released on the regular Family Computer by Square directly and the final one by Asmik.

Games in the series

Madō Senki

 is a "dungeon crawler" presented in a first person perspective, similar to Wizardry. Players navigate nondescript, maze-like corridors in their bid to find the princess. The game was released exclusively in Japan, but on April 15, 2006, Deep Dungeon was unofficially translated into English.

Madō Senki is set in the town of Dorl. One day, monsters raided the town, stealing both the treasures and Princess Etna's soul. Despite the attempts of brave warriors to retrieve her soul, none have been successful.

In the dungeon, the player is given a command list. The player can choose to attack if an enemy is in the vicinity, view allocated items, escape from battle, examine the area for items, and talk if there are people nearby. The character's effectiveness in battle is largely determined by numerical values for attacking power (AP), defensive power (AC), and health (HP). These values are determined by the character's experience level (LEVEL), which raises after the character's accumulated experience (EX) reaches a certain point.

Yūshi no Monshō

, also called Deep Dungeon II: Yūshi no Monshō, is the second installment of the Deep Dungeon series. According to Square Enix, it was the first 3D dungeon crawler RPG for the Famicom console.
In this game, the villain Ruu has returned. The player will need to explore an eight floor tower (consisting of four ground floors and four underground floors) to find him and defeat him.
Battles were much faster paced in this sequel. Whereas the first game could get slow because of the very high miss rate for both player and enemies, creating prolonged battle scenes, this game improved that. It also has a much higher encounter rate, and the player is very likely to be attacked within seconds if they stand still. A new feature to this game is that if the player is significantly higher in level than the enemies for the current floor, they will not be attacked while randomly walking through the hallways (although they will still be attacked when they step on predetermined spaces on the map).
When the player gains an experience level, they are given attribute points to allocate to their character's stats as they wish. (unlike most console RPGs of the era, where stat upgrades are usually predetermined or randomized beyond the player's control)

Yūshi heno Tabi

 is the third installment in the Deep Dungeon series and the first to be released on the Famicom.
This is the first Deep Dungeon title to offer the player a world to explore spanning multiple dungeons and multiple towns.
It also allows the player to create their own party with up to three companions in addition to the hero character, with a choice of ranger, magician or priest for each character. Though the player can dismiss a character once the game has started, they will only be able to replace that character if they meet another pre-created playable character in one of the dungeons. However, the game will still end as soon as the protagonist "swordsman" character is defeated.
This game retains the player-adjustable level-up stats from the first game, as well as the feature that removes randomized encounters if the player is at a significantly higher experience level than needed for their current location.
One exclusive and rather annoying feature of this game engine is that sometimes the player character will fumble (remove) their equipped weapon, wasting that character's turn. If the player wishes to re-arm their weapon, it will cost the player another turn.
This is the only game in the series to award the player money (Gold) when defeating enemies. All other games will force the player to re-enter maps to collect respawning chests for money or items (for resale) if they want to gold farm.

Kuro no Yōjutsushi

 is the fourth and final installment in the Deep Dungeon series.

Unfortunately this game has removed the custom character feature of the previous game.
Through the game, the player will meet up to two additional playable characters with predetermined class. This game also reverts to the standard practice or randomizing characters' stat growth when gaining an experience level.
New to this engine is that the player can eventually learn to summon two monsters to function as a temporary additional party member for a single battle.
It also removed the feature that stops random battles when the player is significantly more powerful than the enemies. This isn't as bad as it seems as the maps in this game are also much smaller (whereas the previous games used multi-floor dungeons up to 32x32 tiles, the dungeons in this game are either single floor, or multiple floors that can fit within a single 32x32 map)
In this game, the player can accept "requests" from the non-player characters. These are optional tasks that will reward the player with bonus items, experience or money when finished.

Notes

References
Game Archive Project

External links
 Square Enix Deep Dungeon Page
Deep Dungeon at RPGClassics

Deep Dungeon Fan Translation at Romhacking.net

1986 video games
1987 video games
1988 video games
1990 video games
Role-playing video games
Famicom Disk System games
Japan-exclusive video games
Nintendo Entertainment System games
Nintendo Entertainment System-only games
Fantasy video games
Square (video game company) games
MSX games
Video games developed in Japan